8 Marta is a rural locality (a settlement) in Severskoye Rural Settlement of Seversky District, Russia. The population was 48 as of 2010.

Streets 
 Stepnaya

Geography 
8 Marta is located 8 km north of Severskaya (the district's administrative centre) by road. Severskaya is the nearest rural locality.

References 

Rural localities in Krasnodar Krai
Populated places in Seversky District